The Spruce Lodge, at 29431 W. US Hwy. 160 in South Fork, Colorado, is a hotel complex whose main original building was built in 1927. It was listed on the National Register of Historic Places in 2008.

The original lodge is a Rustic style  log building with a hipped roof, built upon a concrete basement foundation.  It has a two-story porch supported by round wood posts.

One other building, the "Cook's Cabin", is deemed contributing;  three more buildings are non-contributing.

References

Hotels in Colorado
National Register of Historic Places in Rio Grande County, Colorado
Buildings and structures completed in 1927